Dinanomodon is a genus of dicynodont from Late Permian (Changhsingian) of the Lystrosaurus Assemblage Zone, Katberg Formation, and Cistecephalus Assemblage Zone, Balfour Formation Beaufort Group, Karoo Basin of South Africa.

References 

Dicynodonts
Changhsingian genus first appearances
Early Triassic extinctions
Lopingian synapsids of Africa
Permian South Africa
Triassic South Africa
Fossils of South Africa
Beaufort Group
Fossil taxa described in 1938
Taxa named by Robert Broom
Anomodont genera